The Escalante River is a tributary of the Colorado River. It is formed by the confluence of Upper Valley and Birch Creeks near the town of Escalante in south-central Utah, and from there flows southeast for approximately  before joining Lake Powell. Its watershed includes the high forested slopes of the Aquarius Plateau, the east slope of the Kaiparowits Plateau, and the high desert north of Lake Powell. It was the last river of its size to be discovered in the 48 contiguous U.S. states.
The average discharge is approximately 146 cfs (4.1 m³/s).

The river was first mapped and named by Almon Thompson, a member of the 1872 Colorado River expedition led by John Wesley Powell. It was named after Silvestre Vélez de Escalante, a Franciscan missionary and the first known European explorer of the region. In 1776, Escalante and his Spanish superior Francisco Atanasio Domínguez left from Santa Fe, New Mexico in an attempt to reach Monterey, California. During this journey, usually referred to as the Domínguez–Escalante expedition, Escalante and his companions passed by the Grand Canyon and were the first white men to enter Utah.

Much of the Escalante River's course is through sinuous sandstone gorges. The river and the rugged canyons which drain into it form a key section of Grand Staircase–Escalante National Monument. This spectacular region is a popular destination for hiking and backpacking.

For most of the year, the Escalante River is a small stream, easily stepped across or waded. During spring runoff and the summer monsoon, however, the river can become a raging, muddy torrent ten to one hundred times bigger. In some years, the river can be run using kayaks or canoes (rafts are too large), but this requires both good timings — water which is too high or too low can make travel impossible, stranding boaters — and the willingness to portage boats several hundred vertical feet at the end of the trip.

Gallery

See also
 Canyons of the Escalante
 Coyote Gulch
 List of Utah rivers
 List of tributaries of the Colorado River

Notes

References 
 Peter Gurche (2011) In Search of Desert Beaver: An Assessment of Castor canadensis in the Lower Escalante River Watershed, Whitman College ; Summer-Fall 2011
 Irvine, J. R., & West, N. E. (1979). Riparian tree species distribution and succession along the lower Escalante River, Utah. The Southwestern Naturalist, 331-346 (abstract)
 Webb, R. H. (1985). http://arizona.openrepository.com/arizona/handle/10150/191094 Late Holocene flooding on the Escalante River], south-central Utah.
 WEBB, R. H., & BAKER, V. R. (1987). Changes hydrologic conditions related to large floods on the Escalante River, south-central Utah. In International symposium on flood frequency and risk analyses (pp. 309–323).
 Withers, K., & Mead, J. I. (1993). Late Quaternary vegetation and climate in the Escalante River basin on the central Colorado Plateau. Western North American Naturalist, 53(2), 145-161.

External links 

 BLM:Escalante River Gorge
 UtahRivers.org Escalante River

Rivers of Utah
Tributaries of the Colorado River in Utah
Rivers of Garfield County, Utah
Rivers of Kane County, Utah
Colorado Plateau
Grand Staircase–Escalante National Monument
Glen Canyon National Recreation Area